Bishop Michael Portier (September 7, 1795, Montbrison, France – May 14, 1859, Mobile, Alabama) was a Roman Catholic bishop in the United States and the first Bishop of Mobile. He immigrated to the US in 1817, being ordained there. He later founded many parishes and Catholic institutions in Alabama and Florida, particularly in Mobile. Among them was Providence Hospital. He also recruited religious orders of men and women to teach and care for parishioners.

Biography
Michel Portier was born in Montbrison in the diocese of Lyon, France. He was a student at the seminary in Lyon when recruited by Bishop Dubourg Louis William Valentine Dubourg, for the American mission. He immigrated to the United States at the age of 22 in 1817 with the goal of becoming a priest. He sailed from Bordeaux with Bishop Dubourg and about thirty companions on the French ship of war Caravane and landed after sixty-five days at Annapolis, Maryland on 4 September 1817. Upon arrival, they stayed for nearly two months under the hospitality of Charles Carroll of Carrollton.

Vicar general

After completing his studies at St. Mary's Seminary, in Baltimore, Maryland, where he also studied English, he was ordained deacon. From there he proceeded to St. Louis, where he was ordained to the priesthood for the Diocese of Louisiana and the Two Floridas, by Bishop Dubourg, on May 16, 1818. Yellow fever outbreaks were not infrequent at the time, and he devoted himself to the sick and dying until he too fell ill. Upon his recovery, Bishop Dubourg called Portier to New Orleans, where he established a collegiate school in the former Ursuline convent in the French Quarter. During his time in New Orleans, Portier served as Vicar-General to Bishop Dubourg.

Vicar apostolic
Eight years later, on August 26, 1825, he was consecrated titular Bishop of Oleno by Bishop Joseph Rosati. He became the only Vicar Apostolic of the new Vicariate of Alabama and the Floridas, which included the Territory of Arkansas. At the time of his accession, Portier was the only clergyman in the vicariate and had practically three parishes with churches: Mobile, St. Augustine, and Pensacola. The first priest who came to his assistance was the Rev. Edward T. Mayne, a student of Mt. St. Mary's College, Emmitsburg, Maryland, sent by Bishop England of Charleston, to take charge of the deserted church of St. Augustine. His parishioners were Catholics who were descendants of colonial era peoples, including ethnic French, Spanish, German and African of former French and Spanish territories. Bishop Portier began his administration by riding through his vicariate, offering the Holy Eucharist, preaching, and administering the Sacraments as he went.

Bishop of Mobile
Portier sailed for Europe in 1829 to recruit assistants, and returned with a few seminarians and a priest, Father Mathias Loras. On May 15, 1829, the vicariate was raised to the Diocese of Mobile, and Bishop Portier was made its first bishop. His cathedral was a small church twenty feet wide by fifty feet deep, his residence a still smaller two-roomed frame structure. A new cathedral was begun in 1837, and on December 8, 1850, Bishop Portier consecrated the Cathedral Basilica of the Immaculate Conception. Also in 1850, the eastern portion of Florida was detached from the Diocese of Mobile and annexed to the newly created Roman Catholic Diocese of Savannah, based in Georgia.

In 1830, Bishop Portier established Spring Hill College, and named Father Mathias Loras its head. Loras served in that role until he was consecrated Bishop of Dubuque, Iowa, on December 10, 1837, by Bishop Portier.  The bishop also consecrated Rev. John Stephen Bazin, another president of Spring Hill, and later the third Bishop of Vincennes, Indiana on October 24, 1847.

In 1833 Portier secured from the Georgetown Visitation Monastery, Georgetown, Washington, D.C., a colony of nuns who established the Convent and Academy of the Visitation in Mobile. He brought the Brothers of the Sacred Heart from France about 1847, and the Daughters of Charity from Emmitsburg, Maryland, to manage orphan asylums for boys and girls, respectively. One of his last acts was founding a hospital at Mobile, presently known as Providence Hospital, administered by the Daughters of Charity.

Portier died May 14, 1859, aged 63. He is entombed in the crypt of the Cathedral Basilica of the Immaculate Conception in Mobile.

References 

1795 births
1859 deaths
19th-century Roman Catholic bishops in the United States
French emigrants to the United States
St. Mary's Seminary and University alumni
Roman Catholic Archdiocese of St. Louis
Roman Catholic bishops of Mobile
University and college founders